Gudai is a village in Astore District within the Pakistan-administered region of Gilgit-Baltistan. It is the headquarters of Gudai union council.

Astore District